Palamagamba John Aidan Mwaluko Kabudi (born February 24, 1956) is a Tanzanian lawyer who from April 2021 to January 2022 served as the country's Minister for Constitution and Legal Affairs, appointed by President Samia Suluhu. He was a Minister for Foreign Affairs and East African Cooperation appointed by President John Pombe Magufuli since 2020 to 2021.

Early life and education 
Kabudi was born in Singida, Singida Region. He first attended Kilimatinde Primary school in 1964 then from 1965 to the end of 1966 he went to Kitete Primary school. In 1967 he finally transferred to Berega Primary School  before completing his CPEE at Mvumi Mission Primary School. In 1971 he joined The Tosamaganga Secondary School where he earned CSEE of Ordinary level education. From 1975 to 1976 he completed his ACSEE education at Milambo Secondary School.

Kabudi went to the University of Dar Es Salaam from 1980 to 1983 where he obtained his LLB. He furthered his studies in the same institution from 1984 to 1986 where he was awarded LLM. After that he attended Freie Universität Berlin where he obtained a Juris Doctor.

Political career 
Professor Kabudi got his first cabinet position in the first Magufuli cabinet as the Minister of Justice and constitutional affairs. Following the death of Foreign minister Augustine Mahiga, Kabudi took over the post as the 15th Minister of Foreign Affairs in 2019. He continued to hold this post through the new Suluhu Cabinet in 2021. Following the second major reshuffle of the cabinet in January 2022, Kabudi was released from a cabinet position and was granted a special advisory role in the President's office.

Minister for Foreign Affairs and East African Cooperation 
In 2019, Kabudi summoned Canada's High Commissioner Pamela O'Donnell to protest after a DHC Dash 8-400 turboprop, set to be delivered to state-owned Air Tanzania was impounded in a land compensation dispute.

References 

Living people
Chama Cha Mapinduzi MPs
Chama Cha Mapinduzi politicians
Tanzanian MPs 2015–2020
Tanzanian MPs 2020–2025
Nominated Tanzanian MPs
1956 births
Foreign ministers of Tanzania